This is a list of launches made by the R-7 Semyorka ICBM, and its derivatives between 2020 and 2024. All launches are orbital satellite launches, unless stated otherwise.

Launch statistics

Rocket configurations

Launch sites

Launch outcomes

Launch history

References